is a Japanese professional baseball infielder, playing for the Hanshin Tigers in Japan's Nippon Professional Baseball.

Early Baseball Career
Born in Sendai City, he started playing baseball with his friends as early as 2nd grade, played little league for the Nankodai Shonen baseball club, and joined the Nankodai Tobu Seniors in junior high.

He entered Sendai Ikuei Gakuen High School, a known baseball powerhouse, and played short stop as his team participated twice in the Summer Koshien Tournaments. In his senior year, his team made it all the way to the Spring Koshien semi-finals, and during the summer nationals, he notched a walk-off hit to win the first round against Urawa Gakuin High School. After the nationals, he joined the national team as an outfielder to play in the 2013 18U Baseball World Cup. As the 2nd batter, he helped Japan win the runner up by recording 8 hits and 5 stolen bases.

He entered Rikkyo University and secured the short stop position as his team participated in Tokyo Big6 tournaments. As team captain in his 4th year, he earned the league title for most stolen bases, and led his team to win both the Tokyo Big6 championships and Japan National Collegiate Baseball Championship, a feat that hasn't been achieved by his school in the last 59 years. In 61 league appearances, he finished with a batting average of 0.220, 12 RBIs including a single home run. He again joined the national team to compete at the Baseball at the 2017 Summer Universiade, where Japan took home the gold medal.

Professional Career

Hanshin Tigers

Draft

He was the Hanshin Tigers' 3rd round pick in the 2017 Nippon Professional Baseball draft. He inked a 60 million yen contract with the Tigers for a 10 million yen annual salary. He was assigned the jersey number 4. The 1st round pick of the same draft, pitcher Kosuke Baba, was his teammate in high school.

2018

He joined the main squad during spring training in Okinawa but was sent back to the farm before the season began. He spent the first few weeks playing shortstop or 2nd baseman in minor Western League games. By mid-May, although he batted a lackluster average of 0.214, he topped the league in stolen bases (20 SBs out of 42 games). He was then called to the main squad on May 19 to debut as a 1st base pinch runner for Hayata Ito in the 8th inning, and recorded his career first stolen base during the next batter's at-bat. His first plate appearance came on May 27th as a pinch hitter at the bottom of the 8th, and recorded his first career hit against the Yomiuri Giants in Hanshin Koshien Stadium. After a few more scattered plate appearances, he made it to the starting line-up as 2nd batter on June 30. His 2nd at-bat resulted into his first RBI as a right-handed batter, while he got his 1st hit batting left in his 4th at-bat. He alternated between the main squad and the farms for a few more matches, but was eventually sent back to the farms for the remainder of the season. Out of 19 main squad games, he finished with a 0.231 average, 2 RBIs and 3 stolen bases. He also participated as shortstop during the post-season farm championship match where Hanshin won (8-4), and he was awarded the game's MVP (1 RBI, 1 earned run, 1 stolen base).

2019

He decided to focus on right-handed hitting after the farm spring training in Aki, Kochi. On March 4, the registration was changed from R/D to R/R. He spent the entire season playing in the farms. Out of 114 Western League game appearances, he finished with a batting average of 0.234, 43 RBIs including 2 home runs, and 17 stolen bases. After the regular season, he joined Miyazaki Phoenix League and worked on the outfield defense.

2020

He played in 38 main squad games. While being mainly used as a pinch runner and infield defense, he finished with a batting average of 0.313 (5 hits in 16 at bats), and 3 stolen bases. 

2021

In 2021, while spending the spring training in the farm, the batting is good in the actual battle. Joining the main squad in the middle of the Exhibition games as a utility player who can also handle outfield defense while registering as an infielder, he participated in the match against Tokyo Yakult Swallows (Meiji Jingu Stadium) for the first time on March 28 after the opening, as an official match of the first army. For the first time, he played as an outfielder (right fielder) from the bottom of the 8th inning. In subsequent official games, he was often appointed as a pinch runner in difficult situations that affected the game, and there were many scenes where the success of stealing a base led to a tie and stepping on the home of the final.

2022

In 2022, he started as a main squad player from the opening. In the match against Yokohama DeNA BayStars (Yokohama Stadium) on April 2, he was appointed to the starting lineup for the first time in 545 days since 2020. After that, he was mainly used as a pinch runner at the turning point. In the match against Orix Buffaloes (Kyocera Dome Osaka) on June 11,  he was appointed as a pinch runner for Teruaki Sato in the 11th inning. He stole a base after one out, and catcher Torai Fushimi threw the ball to second base, but the ball hit Kumagai's helmet. While the ball with a different trajectory strayed into the outfield, he immediately ran to home base. This was the final point, and he received a hero interview for the first time after he became a professional. In the match against Chunichi Dragons on June 26 (Koshien), at bat in the bottom of 11th ining, he hit a walk-off single from Takumi Yamamoto. After that, he was mainly used as a pinch runner defense, but on August 8th, he was confirmed to be infected with the COVID-19, and on the next day, he was sent to the farm.

Playing Style
A 1.75 meter infielder, his 50-meter dash was clocked at 5.8 seconds while his farthest distance throw as recorded at 115 meters. He was initially being groomed to be a switch hitter and was registered as such after his draft, but in 2019, he decided to focus on right-handed hitting and master it.

Detailed information

Batting record by year

Defensive record by year

Records 
 First record
 First appearance: May 19, 2018, 10th round against Chunichi Dragons (Nagoya Dome), participated in the top of the 8th inning as a pinch runner for Fumihito Haraguchi
 First stolen base: The same game as above, second stolen in the top of the 8th inning (pitcher: Hiroshi Suzuki, catcher: Shota Ohno)
 First at-bat/first hit: May 27, 2018, against Yomiuri Giants 12th round (Hanshin Koshien Stadium)), a single to left from Shun Ikeda in the bottom of the 8th inning
 First appearance: June 21, 2018, against Orix Buffaloes 3rd round (Hanshin Koshien Stadium), starting as batting second, shortstop
 First RBI: June 30, 2018, against Tokyo Yakult Swallows 8th round (Meiji Jingu Stadium), an RBI single to right from David Huff in the top of the 2nd inning

Uniform number 
4 (2018 -)

Appearance song 
 "BE MY BABY" COMPLEX (2018-2019)
 "AGEHA" Generations from Exile Tribe (2020)
 "AMBITIOUS JAPAN!" TOKIO (2021 -)
 "Limit Break x Survivor" Kiyoshi Hikawa (2022 (even at-bat) -)
 "WA DA DA" Kep1er (2022 (odd at-bat) -)

References

External links
NPB stats

1995 births
Living people
Hanshin Tigers players
Japanese baseball players
Baseball people from Sendai